Vishay Intertechnology, Inc. is an American manufacturer of discrete semiconductors and passive electronic components founded by Polish-born businessman Felix Zandman. Vishay has manufacturing plants in Israel, Asia, Europe, and the Americas where it produces rectifiers, diodes, MOSFETs, optoelectronics, selected integrated circuits, resistors, capacitors, and inductors. Vishay Intertechnology revenues for 2022 were $3.5 billion. , Vishay Intertechnology had approximately 23,900 full-time employees.

Vishay is one of the world's foremost manufacturers of power MOSFETs. They have a wide range of power electronic applications, including portable information appliances, internet communications infrastructure,  power integrated circuits, cell phones, and notebook computers.

History 

Vishay Intertechnology was founded in 1962 by Holocaust survivor Polish-born Dr. Felix Zandman. The company was named after Zandman's ancestral village in present-day Lithuania, Veisiejai. It began operations with a patented technology that had two product lines: foil resistors and foil resistance strain gauges.  In 1985, having grown from a start-up into the world's leading manufacturer of these original products, the company began an ongoing series of acquisitions to become a broadline manufacturer of electronics components.

Having expanded into so many product lines, Vishay announced in October 2009 that it would be creating a spin-off company which focuses on their high precision technologies in Foil Technology. Vishay Precision Group represents approximately 9% of Vishay annual revenue, and included their product lines in Bulk Metal Foil Resistors, micro-measurements, load cells, process weighing, and on-board weighing. In July 2010, Vishay Intertechnology completed the spin-off of Vishay Precision Group (VPG).

Since 1985, Vishay has pursued a business strategy that principally consists of the following elements: expanding within the electronic components industry, primarily through the acquisition of other manufacturers of electronic components; reducing expenses; transferring manufacturing operations to countries with lower labor costs and government-sponsored incentives; maintaining significant production facilities in regions where Vishay markets the bulk of its products; continually rolling out new products; and strengthening relationships with customers and strategic partners. As a result of this strategy, Vishay has grown from a small manufacturer of precision resistors and resistance strain gages to one of the world's largest manufacturers and suppliers of a broad line of electronic components.

Some of the manufacturers that Vishay has acquired include HiRel Systems (2012), the resistor business of Huntington Electric (2011), the wet tantalum capacitor business of KEMET (2008), the PCS business of International Rectifier (2007), BCcomponents (Beyschlag Centralab components, which was previously part of Philips Electronics Components) (2002), General Semiconductor, the infrared components business of Infineon, Mallory (NACC), and Tansitor (2001), Cera-Mite, Electro-Films, and Spectrol (2000), Siliconix and Telefunken (1998), Vitramon (1994), Roederstein (1993), Sprague (1992), Sfernice (1988), Draloric (1987), and Dale (1985).

The former Spectrol Reliance factory in Swindon, England, (UK arm of Spectrol Electronics that was acquired by Vishay in 2000, originally known as Reliance Controls) was the last design by Team 4 (Richard Rogers, Norman Foster and their respective wives), and is considered the first example of High-tech architecture in the United Kingdom. It opened in 1967 and was demolished in 1991, Spectrol Reliance moving to a different part of Swindon.

See also
 Robert C. Sprague 1900-1991 - founder of Sprague Electric company

References

External links 
 

Companies listed on the New York Stock Exchange
Electronics companies of the United States
Semiconductor companies of the United States
Companies based in Chester County, Pennsylvania
American companies established in 1962
1962 establishments in Pennsylvania
Capacitor manufacturers